Geetha Govindam is a 2018 Indian Telugu-language romantic comedy film written and directed by Parasuram. It is produced by Bunny Vas under GA2 Pictures. The film stars Vijay Devarakonda and Rashmika Mandanna, while Subbaraju, Rahul Ramakrishna, and Nagendra Babu play supporting roles.

Though critics felt that it was a "tried and tested story," the film received praise for its direction, performances, and production values.

Plot 
At midnight, Nithya's car breaks down and she seeks help from a bypasser Vijay Govind, who places a condition that he should get a bottle of alcohol and that she should listen to his story. Nithya accepts and realizing him as a non-alcoholic, she asks him about his love story. Vijay reveals the few days ago, he met Geetha at a temple, got attracted to her and realized that she was unmarried. Before he met her again, Vijay heard from his father that his sister Sirisha's marriage was arranged. Vijay boarded a bus to Kakinada, his hometown and realized that Geetha was his co-passenger. 

With the suggestions of his friend Ramakrishna, Vijay tried to woo Geetha who befriended him. While she was in her sleep, Vijay tried to click a selfie but when the bus driver applied brakes, he accidentally kissed her. Geetha, who woke up felt violated and made a phone call to her violent brother Phaneendra, revealing what happened to her. Geetha tied Vijay to the seat and was about to meet Phaneendra in the next stop, but Vijay untied himself when Geetha refused to listen to his justifications and jumped out of the bus. Vijay attending Sirisha's engagement and was shocked to learn that the groom Phaneendra's sister is Geetha. 

Geetha remained surreptitious about the fact that the one who kissed her is Vijay as she did not want to punish Sirisha for her brother's mistake. Phaneendra was desperate to find the one who kissed Geetha. Vijay and Geetha were paired by their families for shopping for the marriage and distributing wedding cards in Hyderabad, where they live. Through out the time they travel, Vijay profusely apologized but Geetha continued to blame, misunderstand and taunt him. Vijay works as a lecturer and his student Neelu was interested in him. When he rejected her advances, she sent a video of her to seduce him that Geetha saw and her opinion on Vijay further intensified. 

When Geetha blamed his upbringing, Vijay reacted violently and asked her to get down of the car and go to her hostel by her own. However, Vijay regretted and ensured that Geetha reached safely. While distributing cards, Vijay stayed in the car while Geetha went to invite her boss: Neelu's mother. Seeing Neelu, Geetha tells Neelu's mother that Vijay was taking advantage of her but Neelu's mother revealed to Geetha that Vijay, the same night barged into their residence, counseled Neelu and told her that he truly loves Geetha. Impressed, Geetha started to admire Vijay who continued to feel vexed by Geetha's taunts that she did for fun. 

Phaneendra, who was on search for Geetha's co-passenger (Vijay) was convinced by Geetha to return home relieving Vijay. Geetha's grandfather suffered from a stroke and her grandmother, who feared that he might not be alive for a long time suggested Geetha's parents to get her married. Phaneendra suggested Vijay as the groom and the family happily accepted. When Vijay learned of this, he met Geetha privately and revealed that he never loved her as he did not see any wife material in her and told her that he should be the only option for his fiancée but not a choice just because her grandparents wanted her to marry. 

Vijay offered to marry her if Geetha would be angry and break Sirisha's marriage due to this. Broken by Vijay's words as he misunderstood her to be the one who breaks Vijay's sister's marriage for his rejection, Geetha apologized to him and lied to her family that she did not like him but revealed to the truth to her grandmother, who was furious with Vijay. Geetha's grandmother arranged Geetha's marriage with a traditional Kishore. Geetha-Kishore and Phaneendra-Sirisha's marriages are scheduled for same time. Vijay regretted and told Phaneendra that he was the one who kissed Geetha. 

Phaneendra, aware of this revealed that Geetha told him the truth and told Vijay that he was Geetha's only option and not a choice. Feeling bad, Vijay went to propose Geetha but she rejected him. Upon Nithya's advise, Vijay angrily mounts the wedding dais, falls at Phaneendra's feet and asks him to let him marry Geetha and does not leave his feet. When Phaneendra looks at Geetha, she gives a positive sign and marries Vijay. The film ends when Geetha is in a bus with Vijay and she kisses him despite pretending to be reluctant at first for pranking him.

Cast

Music 

The soundtrack of the film was composed by Gopi Sundar. Actor Vijay Deverakonda, made his singing debut through this film. The makers unveiled the first single "Inkem Inkem Inkem Kaavaale" on 7 June 2018. The song upon its release, its lyrical video crossed 1 million views in YouTube. Within a day after its release, the song received few covers, including a reprise version and a dubsmash. The soundtrack album features six tracks, including the first single being released. Lyrics for the songs were written by Ananta Sriram, Sri Mani and Sagar. The album was released on 21 June 2018, at an event held at JRC Convention Centre, Film Nagar, Hyderabad, with Allu Arjun becoming the chief guest. The jukebox which was released in YouTube and other platforms during the launch, received 1 million views upon release.

The soundtrack album received positive reviews from music listeners and audiences, with the songs "Inkem Inkem", "Yenti Yenti" and "Vachindamma" being praised. The song "What the Life" sung by Vijay Devarakonda, received applause from youngsters, hailing it as "youth anthem". The sneak peek of the song, earlier titled "What the F" which was released before the audio launch, featured behind-the-scenes footage, with choreography by Jani. However, it received backlash due to the objectionable lyrics, prompting the makers to change the title, to "What The Life". The initial video being deleted from YouTube.

Writing for The Times of India, Neetishta Nyayapati stated "The album of ‘Geetha Govindam’ as a whole offers three strong songs and two subpar ones. ‘Inkem Inkem’, ‘Yenti Yenti’ and ‘Vachindamma’ remain our favourites in this album, offering a softness and authenticity the last two numbers of the album don't. This one's definitely a worthwhile listen for this weekend." Indiaglitz gave the album 3 out of 5 and stated "'Inkem Inkem' and 'Yenti Yenti' stand apart in the album.  Excellent lyrics make it a worthy output.  Gopi Sundar fares decently, over all." 123Telugu stated "So much was expected of Geetha Govindam’s album after Inkem Inkem became a rage. Gopi Sundar’s composition of romantic numbers is great, but the other two numbers are just okay. Inkem Inkem, Yenti Yenti, and Vacchindamma are our picks and looks like they are enough to lift the film during its release time." Moviecrow gave 3 out of 5 and summarised "Gopi Sundar regains his mojo partially with Geetha Govindam and Sid Sriram shines with the two brilliant tracks." Milliblog commented "Gopi seems to be finding his mojo in Telugu again." Siddhartha Toleti of Mirchi9 commented "Geetha Govindam is a pleasant and instantly likeable album with one huge blockbuster single. Parasuram continues to maintain his status as a director with good musical taste."

Release 
Upon the announcement of the film's title, the makers announced that the film will be scheduled to release on August. Later on mid-May 2018, the makers confirmed the release date as 15 August 2018. The film was premiered in the United States, on 14 August, a day before the actual release. Geetha Govindam fetched , from its theatrical rights.

Reception

Critical reception 
Sangeetha Devi Dundoo of The Hindu wrote "Parasuram avoids the melodramatic tropes. Gopi Sundar's music works beautifully for the narrative, with Sid Sriram's Inkem Inkem Inkem Kaavale growing into a new earworm. The welcome humour through Vennela Kishore, Rahul Ramakrishna and Abhay Betiganti also adds a touch of smartness".
The Times of India gave 3.5 out of 5 stars stating "Geetha Govindam has some good humour, fine music and a wonderful lead pair".
The Indian Express gave 3 out of 5 stars stating "What's refreshing about writer-director Parasuram's approach to this romantic-comedy is the way he has handled the leading man".

Hindustan Times gave 3.5 out of 5 stars stating "Geetha Govindam is not about universe conspiring to bring you close to your loved ones, it is about how coincidences can come to bite your behind".
Idlebrain.com gave 3.25 out of 5 stars stating "Geetha Govindam has predictability attached to it. What works for the film are characterizations and performances by lead characters. Writer and director Parasuram writes an engaging screenplay and interesting characterizations. Some of the scenes appear routine, but he makes it up with screenplay".
Great Andhra gave 3.25 out of 5 stars stating "Geetha Govindam is quite old, oft-seen. When the plot is not new, screenplay and actors should do the magic. That is what director Parasuram does with the film".

Firstpost gave 3 out of 5 stars stating "Geetha Govindam, despite its flaws, is a film that gets most things right associated with its genre. It's also a welcome departure for Deverakonda from Arjun Reddy, and proof of the fact that he's no 'one hit wonder' and still has it in him to deliver".

India Today gave 3 out of 5 stars stating "Geetha Govindam does not have an exceptional story that will make you say 'wow' from the word go. It's the same boy-meets-girl-and-how-they-fall-in-love-with-each-other story. But director Parasuram makes Geetha Govindam interesting with his clever writing".
IndiaGlitz gave 3.25 out of 5 stars stating "Geetha Govindam tells an atypical story using a regular format. And it works. Parusuram enlivens the proceedings by infusing comedy at almost every step. Vijay Deverakonda and Rashmika elevate the film with their splendid performances".

Awards and nominations

References

External links 
 

2010s Telugu-language films
Indian romantic comedy films
2018 romantic comedy films
Films shot in Hyderabad, India
Films shot in Andhra Pradesh
Films set in Andhra Pradesh
Films set in Hyderabad, India
Films scored by Gopi Sundar
Films directed by Parasuram